Prostanthera conniana  is a species of flowering plant that is endemic to New South Wales. It is an erect, open shrub with branchlets that are square in cross-section, narrow egg-shaped to narrow oblong leaves, and white flowers with bright yellow markings on the throat, the flowers arranged in groups of four to eight.

Description
The flowers are arranged in groups of four to eight, the sepals green, sometimes with a maroon tinge. Flowering occurs from November to December.

Taxonomy and naming
Prostanthera conniana was first formally described in 2015 by Trevor C. Wilson and others in the journal Telopea. The specific epithet (conniana) honours Barry Conn and his wife Helen.

Distribution and habitat
This mint bush grows on steep rocky slopes in low, open scrub or woodland in four sites near the Shoalhaven River in Bungonia National Park.

References

conniana
Flora of New South Wales
Lamiales of Australia
Plants described in 2015